No Treasure but Hope is the twelfth studio album by English alternative rock band Tindersticks, released on 15 November 2019 on Lucky Dog Recordings/City Slang. Although the album failed to chart in the UK, it achieved modest chart placings in other European countries.

Background
Tindersticks announced the album via a press release on 10 September 2019. The band also shared the album's track listing, artwork and its first single, "The Amputees", along with the single's video, featuring animation from singer Stuart Staples' wife Suzanne Osborne and directed by Staples.

On 23 January 2020, the band released the four-track See My Girls EP, featuring a radio edit and an instrumental version of the album track "See My Girls" as well as two new songs. The video produced for "See My Girls" was a collaboration between Staples and his daughter Sydonie Osborne Staples.

Track listing
All songs are written by Stuart Staples except where noted.

"For the Beauty" (Dan McKinna, Staples) – 4:46
"The Amputees" (McKinna, Staples) – 3:27
"Trees Fall" – 5:04
"Pinky in the Daylight" – 5:22
"Carousel" – 4:39
"Take Care in Your Dreams" (McKinna, David Boulter, Neil Fraser, Staples) – 3:57
"See My Girls" – 5:28
"The Old Mans Gait" (Boulter, Staples) – 4:43
"Tough Love" (Boulter, Staples) – 4:57
"No Treasure but Hope" – 3:51

Personnel

Tindersticks
Stuart Staples – vocals, acoustic rhythm guitar on "Pinky in the Daylight", "Carousel", "Take Care in Your Dreams", "See My Girls" and "The Old Mans Gait"
David Boulter – vibraphone, organ, piano on "See My Girls" and "Tough Love"
Neil Fraser – electric guitar
Dan McKinna – double bass, backing vocals, piano on "For the Beauty", "Pinky in the Daylight", "Carousel" and "No Treasure but Hope", string and horn arrangements
Earl Harvin – percussion, backing vocals

Additional personnel
Natalia Bonner – violin
Calina de la Mare – violin
Alison Dods – violin
Terry Edwards – saxophone on "Tough Love"
Adam Goldsmith – bouzouki on "Pinky in the Daylight"
Howard Gott – violin
Matt Gunner – horns
Rick Coster – violin
Laura Melhuish – violin
Andy Nice – cello
Kate Robinson – violin
Rachel Robson – viola
Tom Rumsby – horns
Sophie Sirota – viola
Rob Spriggs – viola
Richard Steggall – horns
Stanley Staples – acoustic rhythm guitar on "The Amputees", "Trees Fall", "Take Care in Your Dreams", "See My Girls", "The Old Mans Gait" and "Tough Love"
Lucy Wilkins – violin
Sarah Willson – cello

Production
Richard Dumas – artwork
Côme Jalibert – field recording
Suzanne Osborne – artwork
Stuart Staples – artwork

Charts

References

2019 albums
City Slang albums
Tindersticks albums